Sargodha (Punjabi and ) is a city and capital of Sargodha Division, located in Punjab province, Pakistan. It is Pakistan's 12th largest city by population and one of the fastest-growing cities of the country. Sargodha is also known as the City of Eagles.
 It is one of the few planned cities of Pakistan (others include Faisalabad, Islamabad & Gwadar).

History
Sargodha was established by the British as a canal-colony in 1903, and was initially spelled Sargoda. Sargodha was badly affected by an outbreak of the bubonic plague in 1903, and experienced a milder outbreak in 1904. Although it was a small town in the beginning, the British Royal Air Force built an airport here due to its strategic location. The term "Sargodha" has its origin in the words "Sar" (from "sarowar") meaning "pond" and "Godha" meaning "Sadhu", which means "Pond of Godha". This city was founded by Lady Trooper by the supervision of Sir Charles Montgomery Rivaz KCSI (1845 – 7 October 1926), a colonial administrator in British India and Lieutenant-Governor of the Punjab from 1902 to 1907.

Geography

Location
Location of Sargodha with respect to five major cities of Pakistan is as follow:
 North of Karachi
 West of Lahore
 South of Islamabad
 North-West of Faisalabad
 South of Rawalpindi

Sargodha is situated in Pakistani province of Punjab. It is connected to the M-2 by several interchanges at different locations. Directly east connected by the M-2 motorway are Lahore and the route to Rawalpindi and Islamabad. Due east is the city of Jhang; toward the west are the city of Mianwali and the Chashma Barrage.

Topography
Sargodha mainly comprises flat, fertile plains, although here are a few small hills on the Sargodha-Faisalabad Road. The River Jhelum flows on the western and northern sides, and the River Chenab lies on the eastern side of the city. The city is located 190 metres above sea level.

Climate
The city has a climate of extreme heat in the summers and moderate cold in the winters. The maximum temperature reaches  in the summer while the minimum temperature recorded is as low as freezing point in the winter.

Demographics
The total population of the city was 458,440 according to the 1998 census. The majority of the people in the city speak Punjabi with Shahpuri dialect. According to the 2017 Census of Pakistan, the population of city was recorded as 872,557 with a rise of 43.94% from 1998. The population of the metropolitan area (City District) reached 3,903,588, in which around 1 million forms the urban population. The population of Sargodha Division was recorded as 8,181,499 by the 2017 Census of Pakistan.

Economy
The majority of Sargodha's economy is based on agriculture. Sargodha is considered the best citrus-producing area of Pakistan and therefore is also known as the California of Pakistan. Sargodha is largest kinnow-producing district of the world. It produces oranges that are considered high-quality, and supplies them to the different parts of the country. These oranges are also exported to other countries. Sargodha produces a large amount of wheat, cotton, rice and vegetables that are transported to other parts of country and exported to other countries.

There are also textile mills, rice processing plants and Nestle and Shezan juice factories.

The Sargodha Chamber of Commerce and Industry monitors industrial activity in the city and reports their findings to the Federation of Pakistan Chambers of Commerce & Industry and provincial government. A dry port is also under construction in Sargodha.

There are also several shopping malls and trade centres with both international and national outlets. Some of them include:

Mall of Sargodha
Burj Ismail Mall
Xin Mall
Chenone Tower
Burj Huraira Mall
Al-Rehman Trade Centre
Toheed Mall

The fifteen bazaars (markets) of Sargodha remain major trading zones in the city. Each of the fifteen bazaars has a particular name and is known for selling certain goods.
The Model Bazaar contains food court, joyland and shops of grocery and garments.
The Urdu Bazaar contains shops of stationery and books.
The Kachehry Bazaar contains bakeries, street food restaurants and shops of shoes, garments and general stores.
The Amin Bazaar contains shops of fabrics, boutiques, garments and electric appliances.
The Muslim Bazaar contains sanitary items and motorcycle repair shops.
The Anarkali Bazaar contains shops of household items.
The Sarafa Bazaar contains gold and jewellery shops.
The Rail Bazaar contains fabric shops.
The Liaquat Bazaar provides shops for new bicycles and sports cycles.
The Faisal Bazar provides shops for spices, oil, meat and poultry.
The Karkhana Bazaar provides shops for crockery and cutlery products.
The Bans Bazaar supplies dairy and milk products.
The Kabaarhi Bazaar contains shops of brokers.
The Fruit Mandi is a fruit market.
The Sabzi Mandi is a vegetable, meat, fish and grocery market.

Administration
Sargodha is the capital of Sargodha Tehsil. As of October 2012, the division system in Punjab Province has been restored and Sargodha became the divisional headquarters of districts Sargodha, Khushab, Mianwali and Bhakkar. Sargodha became the administrative capital of the Sargodha Division, handling over a population of about 8.1 Million. The Municipal Committee of Sargodha city was upgraded into Municipal Corporation in 1981 when the population of city was increased over half a million. In December 2019, Sargodha Municipal Corporation was upgraded into Metropolitan Corporation under Punjab Local Government Act 2019.

Safe City Project

Sargodha was announced as one of six cities in Punjab whose security would be improved by the Punjab Safe Cities Authority. 5.5 billion Rupees have been allocated for the project, which will be modeled along the lines of the Lahore Safe City project in which 8,000 CCTV cameras were installed throughout the city at a cost of 12 billion rupees to record and send images to Integrated Command and Control Centres.

Health

Hospitals

Education

According to the census of 1998, the literacy rate of Sargodha was 67.8%, while in 2017 the literacy rate was recorded as 80.5%. The city is considered the educational hub of Sargodha Division, handling a population of about 8.1 million. Sargodha Division has its own Education Board for Secondary School Certificate (SSC) and Higher Secondary School Certificate (HSSC) Examinations. There are about four universities and numerous colleges of Medical Sciences, Law, IT, Commerce, Engineering and Intermediate Courses. Quaid-e- Azam Law College is famous for law education.

Board of Intermediate and Secondary Education 
The Board of Intermediate & Secondary Education, Sargodha handles the whole Sargodha Division. It was established in 1968 under the West Pakistan Board of Intermediate & Secondary Education (Multan and Board of Intermediate and Secondary Education, Sargodha) Ordinance No. VII of 1968, with the jurisdiction of Sargodha and Rawalpindi Civil Divisions.

Educational institutes

Transportation

Road

Roads and flyovers

There are 3 flyovers located in the city area to regulate the flow of traffic: 
Khayyam Chowk's flyover has a length of  that leads to Mianwali Road.

Motorways and highways

The N-60 National Highway runs from Sargodha to Lahore through Pindi Bhattian and Sheikhupura. It is also connected to Faisalabad by a highway.

Buses

General Bus Stand is located on Fatima Jinnah Road that provides bus service from Sargodha to almost every part of the country. Daewoo Bus Service drives regular routes from Sargodha to the rest of the country. Others include Niazi Express, Faisal Movers, Bilal Travels, Islamabad Express and Skyways etc.

Taxi and rickshaws

The online cab services Uber and Careem are available in the city. Many auto rickshaws are also available throughout the city, which are often used by those who cannot afford the cab services.

Rail
Sargodha is also connected by the rest of the country through the rail. Sargodha Junction railway station is located on Shorkot-Lala Musa branch railway line. Hazara Express, Millat Express, Sandal Express and Sargodha Express provide daily transport to Rawalpindi, Lahore, Faisalabad, Multan, Karachi and other major cities.

Air base 
Pakistan's largest airbase, PAF Base Mushaf (formerly PAF Base Sargodha), is situated in Sargodha and hosts the headquarters of the Pakistan Air Force's Central Air Command. The airbase is also home to the Combat Commanders School (CCS), formerly the Fighter Leader's School.

Recreation

Points of interest

Kirana Hills
The Kirana Hills are a small and extensive rocky mountain range located in Sargodha. They are a commonly-visited tourist attraction in Sargodha City.

Jinnah Hall

Jinnah Hall is a historical landmark in Sargodha. Jinnah Hall was built in 1949. It was named for Muhammad Ali Jinnah, the founder of Pakistan. Jinnah Hall was originally built as a town hall and library in Company Bagh, Sargodha; now it is currently used as an exhibition hall, event space, and library.

Sports

Sargodha is home to the Sargodha Cricket Stadium. Sargodha's cricket team was a first-class cricket team that represented Sargodha Division. They competed in Pakistan's first-class tournaments in 1961–62 and 2002–03. There's a sports complex adjacent to the stadium that includes gym as well as basketball, badminton and table tennis courts. Moreover, karate classes also take place regularly at the complex.

Mela Mandi Ground is a multi-use historic stadium in Sargodha. It is mostly used for cricket and football. The Mela Mandi Ground was constructed to provide a vast ground for outdoor sports and activities. During March, every year (the country's spring season), several competitions are held here. Almost all Pakistani people watch these annual games.

Sargodha is also home to Sargodha Astroturf Hockey Stadium, located near Mela Mandi Ground. It is home to the Sargodha District Hockey Team, and provides a reliable platform for the city's youth. Galaxy Sports Complex is a renowned Sports Academy of the city.

A flood-lit football ground is under construction in Company Bagh, Sargodha.

Food and drink

Traditional food and drink

The cuisine of Sargodha is similar to that of other regions of South Asia, with some of it originating from the royal kitchens of 16th-century Mughal emperors. Most of those dishes have their roots in British, Indian, Central Asian and Middle Eastern cuisine. Pakistani cooking uses large quantities of spices, herbs, and seasoning. Garlic, ginger, turmeric, red chili, and garam masala are used in most dishes, and home cooking regularly includes curry. Roti, a thin flatbread made from wheat, is a staple food, usually served with curry, meat, vegetables, and lentils. Rice is also common; it is served plain, fried with spices, and in sweet dishes.

Lassi is a traditional drink in Punjab, including Sargodha. Black tea with milk and sugar is also popular throughout the city and is consumed daily by most of the population.

Fast food

Fast food is also very popular across the city. Along with local fast food restaurants, there are also several international fast food outlets in the city, including KFC, McDonald's, Subway and Pizza Hut. The world's biggest Gloria Jean's store is also located in Sargodha.

Awards

In 1966, the Government of Pakistan awarded a special flag, the Hilal-e-Istaqlal to Sargodha (also to Lahore and Sialkot) for showing severe resistance to the enemy during the Indo-Pakistani War of 1965 as these cities were targets of the Indian advance. Every year on Defence Day (6 September), this flag is hoisted in these cities in recognition of the will, courage and perseverance of their people.

Notable people

 Makhdoom Shahabuddin (journalist), Award-winning journalist and Anchor
 Wazir Agha, Urdu Scholar
 Rafiq Anjum, actor
 Imtiaz Bhatti, former Ambassador / High Commissioner of Pakistan
 Rubina Feroze Bhatti, human rights activist
 Aizaz Cheema, cricketer
 Chaudhry Anwar Ali Cheema, politician, PML-Q
 Hameed Gul, former ISI Chief
 Mohammad Hafeez, cricketer
 Farhat Hashmi, Islamic Scholar
 Chaudhary Ghias Ahmed Mela, politician, PML-Q
 Ali Haider Noor Khan Niazi, politician 
 Feroz Khan Noon, former Prime Minister Pakistan
 Anwer Ali Noon, former Parliamentarian of Pakistan and army Officer
 Amjad Ali Noon, former Ambassador / High Commissioner of Pakistan
 Hafiz Muhammad Saeed, Amir Jama'at-ud-Da'wah
 Bakht Singh (1903-2000), prominent Christian leader and church planter, especially in India and Pakistan—born in nearby Joiya village, raised in Sargodha where his father Jawahar Mall owned a factory

References

 
Metropolitan areas of Pakistan
Planned cities in Pakistan